The 2005 Croatian Football Super Cup was the seventh edition of the Croatian Football Super Cup, a football match contested by the winners of the previous season's Croatian First League and Croatian Football Cup competitions. The match was played on 15 July 2005 at Stadion Poljud in Split between 2004–05 Croatian First League winners Hajduk Split and 2004–05 Croatian Football Cup winners Rijeka.

Match details

References 

 2005 Croatian Football Super Cup at HRnogomet.com

2005
HNK Hajduk Split matches
HNK Rijeka matches
Supercup